Hassan Samih Chaitou (born 16 June 1991), also known as Shibriko, is a Lebanese footballer who plays as a left-back for  club Ansar and the Lebanon national team.

Coming through their youth sector, Chaitou made his senior debut in the Lebanese Second Division with Khoyol in 2011. He moved to Safa in the Lebanese Premier League two years later, helping them win a Lebanese Super Cup in 2013. Chaitou joined Ansar in 2015, quickly establishing himself as a regular. He has won a league title, two Lebanese FA Cups and one Super Cup with the side.

Chaitou initially represented Lebanon internationally at under-22 level, playing at the 2013 AFC U-22 Championship qualification in 2012. He made his senior debut in 2018, and was called up to the 2019 AFC Asian Cup, without featuring in the tournament.

Club career 

Coming through the youth system, Chaitou began his senior career at Lebanese Second Division side Khoyol during the 2011–12 season. Following two seasons, Lebanese Premier League club Safa announced the signing of Chaitou on 7 March 2013. In his first season at Safa, Chaito won the 2013 Lebanese Super Cup, beating Shabab Sahel 2–1 in the final. During the 2013–14 season, Chaito played four league games. The following season (2014–15), Chaito didn't feature in the league for Safa.

In 2015 Chaitou joined Ansar. He became a regular for the team, playing 15 league games during the 2015–16 season. The following season, in 2016–17, Chaitou helped his side win the 2016–17 Lebanese FA Cup; he scored three goals in 13 league games that season. In 2020–21, Chaitou helped Ansar win their first league title since 2007, and their 14th overall. He also helped Ansar win the double, beating Nejmeh in the 2020–21 Lebanese FA Cup final on penalty shoot-outs.

International career

Chaitou played for the Lebanon national under-22 team at the 2013 AFC U-22 Championship qualification in 2012. His senior international debut for Lebanon came on 20 November 2018, in a friendly against Australia; Lebanon lost 3–0. In December 2018, Chaitou was called up for the 2019 AFC Asian Cup squad. However, he didn't feature in the tournament.

Style of play 
A modern full-back, Shibriko is a quick player who can both attack and defend down the wing.

Personal life 
Chaitou's nickname comes from the name of his local club in Haret Hreik where he used to play: Shibriko. Indeed, when playing football with his friends, Chaitou wore his club's shirt which bore its name on the back.

Career statistics

International

Honours 
Safa
 Lebanese Super Cup: 2013

Ansar
 Lebanese Premier League: 2020–21
 Lebanese FA Cup: 2016–17, 2020–21; runner-up: 2021–22
 Lebanese Super Cup: 2021
 Lebanese Elite Cup runner-up: 2022

Notes

References

External links

 
 
 
 
 

1991 births
Living people
People from Bint Jbeil District
Lebanese footballers
Association football fullbacks
Lebanese Premier League players
Al Khoyol FC players
Safa SC players
Al Ansar FC players
Lebanon youth international footballers
Lebanon international footballers
2019 AFC Asian Cup players
Lebanese Second Division players